Marcia Talley is an American mystery novelist, author of the Hannah Ives mystery series, two collaborative novels, and numerous short stories. A former librarian, she took early retirement in 2000 to write full-time.

Early life, education and career
Marcia was born in Cleveland, Ohio, the daughter of COL Thomas Chester Dutton, a career U.S. Marine Corps officer, and Lois Elizabeth Tuckerman Dutton, a registered nurse. On September 5, 1964 she married John Barry Talley.

Talley studied French at Oberlin College and obtained her B.A. 1965. She was a librarian at Bryn Mawr School from 1968-1971. She then worked as a cataloguer at St. John's College in Annapolis. She received a master's degree from the University of Maryland, College Park in 1981. Later, Talley later worked for TeleSec Library Services, the American Bankers Association, the U.S. General Accounting Office and the U.S. Naval Academy Library.

Talley is a member of the Mystery Writers of America, Sisters in Crime, Authors Guild and the Crime Writers Association (UK). From 2009-2010 she served as national president of Sisters in Crime, Inc.

Awards
 Romantic Times Reviewers Choice Awards, Best Contemporary Mystery, "Unbreathed Memories," 2000 
 Agatha Award, Best Short Story, "Too Many Cooks," 2003 
 Anthony Award, Best Short Story, "Too Many Cooks," 2003 
 Agatha Award, Best Short Story, "Driven to Distraction," 2005 
 Arts Council of Anne Arundel County "Annie" Award for Excellence in the Literary Arts, 2005

References

External links
 Marcia Talley Web site

20th-century American novelists
20th-century American short story writers
20th-century American women writers
21st-century American novelists
21st-century American short story writers
21st-century American women writers
Agatha Award winners
American Bankers Association
American mystery writers
American women novelists
American women short story writers
Anthony Award winners
Living people
Oberlin College alumni
University of Maryland, College Park alumni
Women mystery writers
Writers from Annapolis, Maryland
Writers from Cleveland
Novelists from Maryland
Novelists from Ohio
Bryn Mawr School people
Year of birth missing (living people)